Maurice Patrick Barrett (4 June 1893 – 9 November 1981) was an Australian rules footballer who played with Fitzroy in the Victorian Football League (VFL).

Notes

External links 

1893 births
1981 deaths
Australian rules footballers from Victoria (Australia)		
Fitzroy Football Club players